Otto Oppenheimer (1882–1948) was a British diamond dealer, who ran the London end of the De Beers company for his brother Sir Ernest Oppenheimer.

He was the son of Eduard Oppenheimer, a cigar merchant, and his wife Nanette "Nanny" Hirschhorn.

His son was Sir Philip Oppenheimer.

References

Bibliography 
The Rise and Fall of Diamonds by Edward Jay Epstein. (1982)

Industrial Diamond review volume 40.(1980)

The Diamond Invention by Edward Jay Epstein. (1982)

Glitter and Greed by Janine Farrallel Robert

West African Diamonds 1919-1983; An economic history by Peter Greenhalgh 1985

1882 births
1948 deaths
Otto
Merchants from London
Diamond dealers
20th-century English businesspeople